The National Rugby League Hall of Fame was established in 2018, to help recognise the contributions made to the National Rugby League, Australian Rugby League, Super League and New South Wales Rugby League since 1908 by players, referees, media personalities, coaches and administrators. It was initially established with 100 inductees.

Selection Process

Categories

Player 
Individuals who have competed in the elite premiership rugby league competition in Australia and achieved outstanding feats on and off the field throughout a professional playing career.

Coach 
People who have coached in the elite premiership rugby league competition in Australia and consistently achieved outstanding results throughout a professional coaching career.

Referee 
People who have officiated in the elite premiership rugby league competition in Australia and displayed fairness and integrity consistently throughout a career as a match official.

Contributor 
People who have contributed significantly to the growth, popularity and prosperity of the elite premiership rugby league competition in Australia.

Eligibility Criteria

Player 
1. Individual must have competed in the elite premiership rugby league competition in Australia

2. Individual must have played the majority of their elite rugby league career in Australia

3. Individual must be retired five years from competing in a professional sporting competition

Coach 
1. Individual must have coached at a first-grade level in the elite premiership rugby league competition in Australia

2. Individual may be nominated and inducted at any stage of professional or post-career

Referee 
1. Individual must have officiated at a first-grade level in the elite premiership rugby league competition in Australia

2. Individual must be retired three years from officiating in the elite rugby league competition in Australia

Contributor 
1. Individual must have contributed significantly to the elite premiership rugby league competition in Australia in fields other than Player, Coach or Referee.

2. Individual may be nominated and inducted at any stage of professional or post-career

Metrics of Excellence 
The Metrics of Excellence, or simply Metrics, is a tailored weighting system applied to specific accolades and areas of achievement at the elite level of the game (i.e. Premiership games played; State of Origin games played; Dally M Medal; Clive Churchill Medal, Grand Finals played, etc.).

The Metrics application automatically compiles players based on the aggregate of points achieved through their collective career achievements. A purely objective function, the application effectively acts as a filtering mechanism.

Equalisation functions are built into the Metrics application to ensure parity for players from different eras of the game (i.e. Pre-War, Wartime period, Super League, etc.) and competitions (i.e. Brisbane Rugby League, Country Rugby League, etc.)

Voting Process - Player 
1. Metrics of Excellence applied to all individuals that have competed in the elite premiership rugby league competition in Australia from 1908 through to the designated qualification year

2. Complete list of qualified players recompiled based on Metrics results.

3. Top one-hundred (100) players to achieve the highest aggregate of points through the Metrics process, extracted from complete list and populated on to the Hall of Fame Provisional Ballot.

4. Provisional Ballot advanced to Screening Committee for screening process.

5. Top twenty-five (25) players selected via screening process populated on to the Hall of Fame Final Ballot.

6. Final Ballot advanced to Voting College for final selection.

Screening Process 
1. Provisional Ballot presented to the Screening Committee for initial evaluation.

2. Screening Committee to reduce the Provisional Ballot to fifty (50) by the end of the first deliberation stage.

3. Screening Committee then tasked with reducing the list from 50 to the final 25 players by the conclusion of the second deliberation stage.

4. Final Ballot (25) confirmed and documented by the Awards Sub-Committee.

Induction Determinant 
Individuals that achieve an aggregate of 10% or greater of the total points available (375) will qualify for induction into the NRL Hall of Fame.

Induction Parameters

Player 
Minimum two inductions – Maximum four inductions per annual cycle In the event players, outside of the top four tally the same number of votes as those within the top four – a countback mechanism will be executed to determine who received the higher number of five point votes, four point votes, three point votes, etc.

Coach & Referee 
Minimum of one induction – Maximum two inductions per four-year cycle

Contributor 
Minimum of one induction – Maximum three inductions per two-year cycle

Hall of Fame Inductees

Players

Contributors

Immortals 
The Immortals category is reserved for those who are deemed to have had a significant impact on the game of Rugby League. Being named as an "Immortal" of the National Rugby League Hall of Fame is the highest honour which one can receive in the NRL.

Originally Australian sports magazine Rugby League Week named the immortals. In 2017 Rugby League Week closed down and the concept was taken over by the Australian Rugby League Commission.

 

Rugby league in Australia